"LoveLife" is the first single from Kate Ryan's new album, Electroshock. It is released worldwide on iTunes on 11 April 2011. The song is written By British writers, Paul Drew, Greig Watts, Pete Barringer (known as DWB) and Georgie Dennis and is based on a riff from another song, Narcotic by Liquido.

Music video
A music video to accompany the release of "LoveLife" was first released onto YouTube on 12 April 2011 at a total length of three minutes and twenty-nine seconds.

Track listing
 Digital download
 "Lovelife" (Radio Edit) - 3:42
 "Lovelife" (Extended Version) - 4:55
 "Lovelife" (Mike Candys Remix) - 5:28
 "Lovelife" (Instrumental Radio Edit) - 3:43

Chart performance

Release history

References

External links
 

Kate Ryan songs
2011 singles